Chauncey Brewer Sabin (August 6, 1824 – March 30, 1890) was a United States district judge of the United States District Court for the Eastern District of Texas.

Education and career

Born in Oneonta, New York, Sabin read law to enter the bar in 1846. He was in private practice in Albany, New York from 1846 to 1847, in Houston, Texas from 1847 to 1861, in New York City, New York from 1863 to 1865, in Houston from 1865 to 1866, and in Washington, D.C., from 1866 to 1867. He was a Judge of the Third Judicial District of Texas from 1867 to 1868. He was in private practice in Washington, D.C. from 1868 to 1870. He was appointed as a Justice of the Supreme Court of Texas by military authorities during the Reconstruction Era, in March 1870, but no record of service has been found to indicate that he actually served in this capacity. He was a Judge of the District Court of Texas, Galveston District in 1871. He was city attorney of Galveston, Texas from 1872 to 1873. He was a member of the Texas House of Representatives in 1873. He was Postmaster of Galveston from 1874 to 1882. He was in private practice in Galveston from 1882 to 1884.

Federal judicial service

Sabin was nominated by President Chester A. Arthur on March 25, 1884, to a seat on the United States District Court for the Eastern District of Texas vacated by Judge Amos Morrill. He was confirmed by the United States Senate on April 5, 1884, and received his commission the same day. His service terminated on March 30, 1890, due to his death in Galveston.

References

1824 births
1890 deaths
Judges of the United States District Court for the Eastern District of Texas
United States federal judges appointed by Chester A. Arthur
19th-century American judges
People from Galveston, Texas
People from Oneonta, New York
19th-century American politicians
United States federal judges admitted to the practice of law by reading law